Nyeem Young (born 22 September 2000) is a West Indian cricketer. Young was named in the West Indies' squads for the 2018 Under-19 Cricket World Cup and the 2020 Under-19 Cricket World Cup. At the 2020 tournament, in the Group B match against England, Young became the first cricketer for the West Indies to score a fifty and take a five wicket haul in the same U19 match. For his performance, he was named the man of the match.

Following his performance in the Under-19 Cricket World Cup, he was signed by the Barbados Tridents to play in the Caribbean Premier League. He made his Twenty20 debut on 25 August 2020, for the Barbados Tridents in the 2020 Caribbean Premier League.

In March 2022, Young was called up to a white-ball training squad with the national team to prepare for international fixtures during 2022.

References

External links
 

2001 births
Living people
Barbados Royals cricketers
Place of birth missing (living people)